Vaglierano is a frazione (and parish) of the municipality of Asti, in Piedmont, northern Italy.

Overview

It is a village on a hill between the valleys of Borbore and Tanaro.

History 
Since 1929 Vaglierano was a separate comune; in that year it was aggregated to the municipality of Asti by the Royal charter n. 736 of March 28, 1929.

References

External links

Frazioni of the Province of Asti
Former municipalities of the Province of Asti